David Ellwand (born 1966) is an English photographer, illustrator, and author. He is a trained photographer, who has exhibited his landscape and abstract photographs throughout western Europe and the United States.

Ellwand is known for his photography on award-winning, best-selling fashion books for fairies, Fairie-ality: The Fashion Collection from the House of Ellwand and Fairie‐ality Style. He is also known for his award-winning Amazing Baby board book series for Templar Publishing, as well as the best-selling books Ten in a Bed, Teddy Bears, and Cinderlily. His other works have been published by the Penguin Group's Dutton Children's Books; HarperCollins (US); Chronicle Books; Templar Publishing; Baker & Taylor's Silver Dolphin Books; L'Ecole des Loisirs (France); and Moritz Verlag-GmbH (Germany). His target audience includes babies and children up to eight years of age.

Personal background 
David Ellwand was born in 1966, in Liverpool, England. He graduated from Kettlethorpe High School in 1984 and studied photography at Kitson College in Leeds, England. Ellwand is married to Ruth Huddleston. She is a former sales and marketing director with Templar Publishing. He used to work from a studio in an old converted church in Dorset, England but now lives in West Sussex with his wife and daughter, Lydia.

Professional background 

David Ellwand began his career in photography at the age of 18. In 1991, he set up a photography studio, primarily focusing on producing commercial photography for advertising agencies. He later moved into book illustration and photography, using a variety of mixed media, formatting, and techniques. Several of his better known works include black-and-white photographs, as well as collage and mixed media using hand-tinted, full-colour photography, using natural items and household objects.

In April 2010, Ellwand was featured on the children's television programme, Blue Peter. He was commissioned to design and create a large wooden house out of a tree trunk for the fairies to live, in the Blue Peter Garden. The episode featured him showing the programme presenter, Andy Akinwolere, how to create a selection of small pieces of furniture for the house.

In 2011, Ellwand began working on a series of books based around the supernatural, experimenting with historical photographic processes, including wet collodion process. Drawn to the supernatural, he notes, "I've been to a lot of places where folklorists say that fairies have been sighted. Nowadays anything supernatural might be purported to be a UFO, but in Victorian times it would be considered to be a fairie, or a will-o'-the-wisp, or whatever. It's really quite fascinating."

Photography 
Fairie-ality series
Ellwand's best-selling fashion books for fairies, Fairie-ality: The Fashion Collection from the House of Ellwand and Fairie‐ality Style, were published by Candlewick Press in 2002 and 2009. The book showcases 150 fashion designs created out of household items, as well as flowers, feathers, leaves, grass, shells, and material found in nature. Fashioned art pieces include dresses, coats, trousers, hats, undergarments, and shoes. The series was so successful that he was asked by Elle Magazine to create a gown for their Christmas issue. Shoe designer Stuart Weitzman, commissioned eight almost-human-sized "fairie" shoes for a window display making the round of his boutiques. In 2003, Madame Alexander dolls created a Fairie-ality doll and trunk set. In 2004, Cedco Publishing manufactured two journals, based on the Fairie-ality series.

 Bird, Eugenie; Downton, David (illustrator); and Ellwand, David (photographer). Fairie-ality: The Fashion Collection from the House of Ellwand, Candlewick Press, 2002. 
 Fairie-ality Journal: Feather Fairie Dress, Cedco Publishing, 2004. 
 Fairie-ality Bound 6x8 Journal, Cedco Publishing, 2004. 
 Fairie‐ality Style: A Sourcebook of Inspirations from Nature, Candlewick Press, 2009. 

Baby Unique series
 Baby Unique, Candlewick Press, 2005. 
 Baby Unique Moments: A Record Book, Candlewick Press, 2006. 

Amazing Baby Series
 Amazing Baby: I Love You!, Silver Dolphin Books, 2004. 
 Amazing Baby: Baby, Boo!, Silver Dolphin Books, 2006. 
 Amazing Baby: Twinkle, Twinkle!, Silver Dolphin Books, 2006. 
 Amazing Baby: Baby's Day!, Silver Dolphin Books, 2006. 
 Amazing Baby: Peekaboo, Puppy!, Silver Dolphin Books, 2006. 
 Amazing Baby: Hello Baby!, Silver Dolphin Books, 2006. 
 Amazing Baby: Go, Baby, Go!, Silver Dolphin Books, 2006. 
 Amazing Baby: Yum-Yum, Baby!, Silver Dolphin Books, 2007. 
 Amazing Baby: Spots and Dots!, Silver Dolphin Books, 2007. 
 Amazing Baby: Night-Night, Baby!, Silver Dolphin Books, 2007. 
 Amazing Baby: Picture Pairs!, Silver Dolphin Books, 2007. 
 Amazing Baby: Rainbow Fun!, Silver Dolphin Books, 2008. 
 Amazing Baby: Five Little Ducks!, Silver Dolphin Books, 2008. 

Retro Photo
 Retro Photo: An Obsession: A Personal Selection of Vintage Cameras and the Photographs They Take, Old Barn Studio, an imprint of Old Barn Books, UK, 2015.  And Candlewick Studio, an imprint of Candlewick Press, US/Can, 2016.

Illustration 
 Ellwand, David (illustrator). Jingle Bells (Teddy Bear Sing-Along), Silver Dolphin Books, 2011. 
 Ellwand, David (illustrator). Teddy Time (Book and Stacking Boxes), Silver Dolphin Books, 2011.

Authored works 
Children's books
 Ellwand, David. Beaucoup de beaux bébés, L'Ecole des Loisirs, 1995. 
 Ellwand, David. Baby strahlt, Baby weint, Moritz Verlag-GmbH, 1997. 
 Ellwand, David. Emma's Elephant: And Other Favorite Animal Friends, Dutton Children's Books, 1997. 
 Ellwand, David. Alfred's Camera: A Collection of Picture Puzzles , Dutton Children's Books, 1999. 
 Ellwand, David. Alfred's Party: A Collection of Picture Puzzles, Dutton Children's Books, 2000. 
 Ellwand, David; Ellwand, Ruth; Ellwand, David (photography). Midas Mouse, HarperCollins Children's Books, 2000. 
 Ellwand, David. Ten in the Bed, Advanced Marketing, 2002. 
 Ellwand, David. Clap your Hands, Chronicle Books, 2002. 
 Ellwand, David; and Steer, Dugald. Tickle Teddy: A Touch-and-Feel Book, Chronicle Books, 2002. ASIN B001HUD77U
 Ellwand, David; Moore, Clement Clarke; and Steer, Dugald. Santa Ted, Chronicle Books, 2003. 
 Ellwand, David; Tagg, Christine; Ellwand, David (photography). Metal Mutz!, Candlewick Press, 2003. 
 Ellwand, David; Tagg, Christine; Ellwand, David (photography). Cinderlily: A Floral Fairy Tale, Candlewick Press, 2003. 
 Ellwand, David. The Big Book of Beautiful Babies, Ragged Bears Publishing, 2005. 
 Ellwand, David; Ellwand, Ruth; Ellwand, David (photography). The Mystery of the Fool and the Vanisher, Candlewick Press, 2008. 
 Ellwand, David. Wheels on the Bus, Silver Dolphin Books, 2010. 
 Ellwand, David. Old Macdonald, Silver Dolphin Books, 2010. 
 Ellwand, David. Row, Row, Row Your Boat (Teddy Bear Sing-Along), Silver Dolphin Books, 2011. 
 Ellwand, David. Head, Shoulders, Knees, and Toes (Teddy Bear Sing-Along), Silver Dolphin Books, 2011. 

Boasting series
 Ellwand, David. Perfect Pets Boasting Book, Ragged Bears Publishing, 1997. 
 Ellwand, David. Gorgeous Grandchildren Boasting Book, Ragged Bears Publishing, 2005. 
 Ellwand, David. Beautiful Babies Boasting Book, Ragged Bears Publishing, 2005. 
 Ellwand, David. D. E. Mummy's Boasting Book, Ragged Bears Publishing, 2005. 
 Ellwand, David. My Boasting Book D.E., Ragged Bears Publishing, 2005. 
 Ellwand, David. Daddy's Boasting Book, Ragged Bears Publishing, 2005. 
 Ellwand, David. Granny's Boasting Book, Ragged Bears Publishing, 2005. 
 Ellwand, David. Grandpa's Boasting Book, Ragged Bears Publishing, 2005. 
 Ellwand, David. Great-Granny's Boasting Book, Ragged Bears Publishing, 2005. 
 Ellwand, David. Great-Grandpa's Boasting Book, Ragged Bears Publishing, 2005.

Honors and awards 
 2003: British Book Awards' Stora Enso Design and Production Award for Fairie-ality, the Fashion Collection from The House of Ellwand
 2002: American Booksellers Association's Book Sense 76 Selection for Fairie-ality, the Fashion Collection from The House of Ellwand
 2002: Hong Kong Print Awards' Best Printed Book Prize for Fairie-ality, the Fashion Collection from The House of Ellwand
 2002: American Library Association's Best Book for Young Adults for Fairie-ality, the Fashion Collection from The House of Ellwand
 2003: New England Book Show's Best of Show for Fairie-ality, the Fashion Collection from The House of Ellwand
 2003: New England Book Show's Best Book Manufacturing for Fairie-ality, the Fashion Collection from The House of Ellwand
 2004: Booktrust Early Years Awards' Baby Book Award for I Love You!
 2010: New England Book Show's Best Pictorial Book for Fairie-ality Style: A Sourcebook of Inspirations from Nature
 2010: Printing Industries of America's Benny Award for Fairie-ality Style: A Sourcebook of Inspirations from Nature

References

External links 
 
 http://www.fairie-ality.com/
 https://web.archive.org/web/20111105141225/http://www.fairiealitystyle.com/

Photographers from Liverpool
1966 births
Living people
English children's writers